Westenhanger railway station is on the South Eastern Main Line in England, serving the villages of Westenhanger and Stanford, as well as Folkestone Racecourse, in Kent. It is  down the line from London Charing Cross. The station and all trains that call are operated by Southeastern.

History
The station was built by the South Eastern Railway (SER). The line through the station opened on 28 June 1843, before construction had started. It was announced on 28 November 1843 and was planned to be the station serving Hythe; the SER Chairman Joseph Baxendale hoped to stand as a candidate in the next general election for that constituency. An inn was built next to the station in September.

The station became a junction when the SER's branch line to  opened on 10 October 1864. However, it was inconveniently placed, and the SER considered closing it and building a station somewhere else. Ultimately, the station was not closed and Sandling railway station opened.

British Rail proposed the closure of the station as from 3 February 1969. Objections were made which were considered by a Transport Users' Consultative Committee, after which the Minister of Transport decided against closure.

In 2017, Shepway District Council announced plans to build a garden town next to the station, with around 12,000 new homes.

Racecourse station
In 1898, a station about 250 metres west of Westenhanger was built to serve the adjacent Folkestone Racecourse. It was only used on race days. It closed in the 1960s.1976  As in 2022 the majority of the disused platforms were still in situ.

Facilities
The station is unstaffed and facilities are limited.

There is a self-service ticket machine at the station entrance and passenger help points located on each of the platforms. There is also a small (free) car park at the station entrance.

The station has step-free access available to the London bound platform although the Dover bound platform can only be reached via the footbridge meaning step-free access is not possible.

Services
All services at Westenhanger are operated by Southeastern using Class 375 EMUs.

The typical off-peak service in trains per hour is:
 1 tph to London Charing Cross via 
 1 tph to 

References
Citations

Sources

External links

Transport in Folkestone and Hythe
Railway stations in Kent
DfT Category F1 stations
Former South Eastern Railway (UK) stations
Railway stations in Great Britain opened in 1844
Railway stations served by Southeastern
1844 establishments in England